The 1912–13 Notre Dame men's ice hockey season was the inaugural season of play for the program.

Season
For their second season, Notre Dame increased its schedule from one to three games. The lack of other college ice hockey programs near Notre Dame's campus in South Bend left the administration with little recourse but to suspend operations as there was little reason to keep the program running. The geographically closest college was Cornell, nearly 600 miles away in upstate New York. The program would eventually return after World War I.

Note: Notre Dame was not officially known as the 'Fighting Irish' until 1919.

Roster

Standings

Schedule and results

|-
!colspan=12 style=";" | Regular Season

References

Notre Dame Fighting Irish men's ice hockey seasons
Notre Dame
Notre Dame
Notre Dame
Notre Dame